Tieshan is a town in Zhenghe County, Fujian province, China. , it administers Niubeishan Residential Community and the following fourteen villages:
Tieshan Village
Nangan Village
Donggan Village
Litunyang Village
Dahong Village
Jiangshang Village
Zhangtun Village
Xiangqian Village
Gaolin Village
Banyuan Village
Fenglin Village
Yuanshan Village
Daling Village
Luojiadi Village

References

Township-level divisions of Fujian
Zhenghe County